Vishal may refer to:

People 
 Vishal (name), a common Indian given name

 King Vishal, emperor of the Mahabharata era who founded the ancient city of Vishalapura
 Vishal (actor) (born 1977), Indian film actor, producer and anti-piracy activist
 Vishal–Shekhar, Indian musical duo consisting of Vishal Dadlani and Shekhar Ravjiani

Buildings and places 
 De Vishal, a historical building and gallery in Haarlem, the Netherlands. 
 Vishalgad, fort of Shivaji in Maharashtra
 Vishal Badri, synonym of the Badrinath temple in Uttarakhand's Himalaya

Politics 
Vishal Haryana Party, a former political party
Vishal Sangh, a former trade union in Fiji

Other uses 
 INS Vishal (IAC-II), aircraft carrier of Indian Navy
 Vishal Film Factory, owned by the popular Tamil actor Vishal

See also